Vater und Sohn may refer to: 

 Father and Son (1918 film), a 1918 silent film directed by William Wauer
 Father and Son (1929 German film), a 1929 silent film directed by Géza von Bolváry 
 Father and Son (1930 film), a 1930 German-Swedish film directed by Victor Sjöström 
 Father and Son (comics), comic figures created by  E. O. Plauen